Ángel Santiago Monares Cruz (born July 24, 1973, in Guadalajara, Jalisco) is a Mexican football manager and former player.

Career
After a 12-year career as a professional footballer with Tecos F.C., Puebla F.C. and Chivas de Guadalajara, Monares managed Cimarrones de Sonora during 2014.

References

External links
 
ligamx.net

1973 births
Living people
Mexican footballers
Mexican football managers
Tecos F.C. footballers
Club Puebla players
Liga MX players
Footballers from Guadalajara, Jalisco
Association footballers not categorized by position